World Combat (ワールドコンバット), also known as Warzaid, is a military themed first-person light gun rail shooter. The arcade game comes in two types of cabinets, one for four players and one for two players. The game possesses many similarities to Namco's Time Crisis series, including player's ability to take cover. Each player character is equipped with a large, portable metal shield that can block incoming projectiles. Unlike the Time Crisis games, however, this shield is not activated by a foot pedal but rather by pointing the gun outside the screen (like many classic first-person rail shooters, shooting off-screen reloads the player's weapon). The game also features a mechanic similar to Time Crisis's "Crisis Sighting", where most enemy projectiles miss the player harmlessly, but those that are an immediate threat slow down and are much larger than average, giving the player a small window to react.

Though the game is cooperative, there are a few light competitive elements. For one, players start at a rank of Private Second Class and are allowed to ascend in ranks (to Field Marshal) at the end of each mission, depending on how well they play. The player with the highest rank (or score, if the ranks are equal) is called the "leader" and is awarded an extra life.

Each player takes control of a soldier involved in a massive conflict against an army of undead equipped with modern weaponry.  Weapons include a semi-automatic rifle, which the player starts with, a machine gun, and a rocket launcher. The game features enemies such as rifle-toting skeletons, tanks, jets, and helicopters.

Konami released a follow-up to the game Wartran Troopers in 2004.

Stages/Boss 
Stage 1 (SEASIDE) Boss - 1 Attack helicopter & 1 Transport helicopter

Two helicopters that appear in the trench at the end of the stage. Attack helicopters equipped with powerful weapons and transport helicopters carrying armed soldiers alternately attack. The weak point is that both machines can be shot down with a single shot if they are shot through the cockpit.

Stage 2 - 4 (HOTEL/TOWN/JUNGLE) Boss - VTOL Jet (HOTEL) 2 Tanks (TOWN) 4 Elite Skeleton Soldiers (JUNGLE)

This stage, the JUNGLE stage, and the TOWN stage differ in the order in which they proceed depending on the machine settings. There is also a Skeleton Soldier who loses a life somewhere in the 3 stages.

HOTEL Stage Boss - Bosses attack with machine guns and missiles. If you take more time, skull soldiers that drop rocket launchers and machine guns will appear in the back of the screen.

JUNGLE Stage Boss - A group of skull soldiers that descend by helicopter, but they attack in coordination with powerful machine guns and bazookas. The attack position is roughly determined, but it is difficult to defeat because it moves. In addition, another special forces soldier may attack while moving, which is a difficult early stage.A simple skull soldier may appear, but a marker will appear on the target Elite Skeleton soldier.

TOWN Stage Boss - As time passes, skull soldiers will appear in the turrets and attack along with the artillery fire.

Stage 5 - (SNOW MOUNTAIN) Boss - Enemy Flamethrower inside a plane.

The normal skull soldiers are around, it becomes hard to attack as time limit passed.

Stage 6 - (MOUNTAIN) Boss - Several small helicopters

With intense machine gun attacks and high mobility, it takes turns attacking. There are also helicopters that launch missiles after a while

Stage 7 - (GLASS LANDS) Boss - None

A stage where you destroy the many anti-aircraft vehicles deployed in the grassland. Anti-aircraft vehicles have ranged missile attacks (multiple players take damage), and armored vehicles torment players with machine gun barrages.

Stage 8 - (BRIDGE) Boss - 3 tanks

It has high durability, and many skull soldiers are deployed.

Stage 9 - (AIRPORT) Boss - None

A stage to attack an enemy air base in order to develop a big counteroffensive operation. Get on the vehicle and run around the stage until the time limit is over.

Satge 10 - (WOODS) Boss - 4 Enemy Flamethrowers

A stage where you intercept enemy troops (airborne) parachuting in a foggy forest. It descends from the middle stage, and it becomes a stage with a difficulty suitable for the final stage of fighting against a large enemy army that has joined the armored car. A tank will also appear at the end of the stage.

This time, all of them are armed with flamethrowers, and while hiding themselves in rocks and wreckage, they attack in the same way or alternately with the jungle.

Stage 11 - (DESERT) Boss - Skeleton Commander (1st) & Giant Skeleton (2nd & Final)

The final stage where you fight hard to end the battle with the Undead Army. Since the enemy comes out to counterattack using various weapons so far, it is already a fierce battle from the beginning. Also, in the middle of the stage, there is a scene where a helicopter suddenly appears on the screen and attacks. Also, there is a scene where they are transporting something like a large continental ballistic missile, and it is necessary to destroy it. In the final stage, head to capture Commander Skull, who is giving orders from the control tower. The number of enemies and the number of hit bullets are large, so if you don't defeat them reliably, you won't be able to reach the commander. When you reach the commander, you will fight while going around the control tower.

 Skeleton Commander - The boss can be defeated with one shot, but since many skull soldiers also appear, it is difficult to get a chance to attack. Also, if you clear all the stages and defeat this boss, the Giant Skeleton will appear from the desert.
 Giant Skeleton - A monster that has a health value of 100 and regenerates itself, Until you see it through, it's very difficult to defend against attacks such as mow down and thrusts with its arms, and poison gas attacks that spew out from its mouth. Occasionally, there is a feint that changes the attack hand. This attack is difficult to defend against, as it takes a long time to hit. The weak point is that Giant Skeleton's eye.

External links

2003 video games
Arcade video games
Arcade-only video games
Light gun games
Cooperative video games
Konami games
Konami arcade games
Video games developed in Japan

2002 video games